The Bread and Cheese Revolt (or Bread-and-Cheese War) in Kennemerland, North Holland, was a folk uprising in 1491—92 when peasants and fishermen were provoked by an economic crisis, the tax oppression and garrison policy of John III of Egmont, the stadtholder appointed back in 1483 by Maximilian I.  The revolt took its name from the emblems on the banners of insurgents.

The people, supported by inhabitants of Hoorn, Alkmaar and Haarlem, occupied those locations.  The most hated tax collectors were killed. The insurgents stormed and destroyed two castles.  The revolt was scotched by the troops of Albert III, Duke of Saxony when over 200 peasants were killed.

Notes

1491 in Europe
1492 in Europe
Conflicts in 1491 
Conflicts in 1492
15th-century rebellions
History of Haarlem
15th century in the Netherlands
Economic history of the Netherlands
Agriculture in the Netherlands
Fishing in the Netherlands